Makdin-e Sofla (also Romanized as Makdīn-e Soflá and Makdin Sofla; also known as Makdīn-e Pā’īn, Makedīn, Makeh Dīn Soflá, Makhdī, and Qal‘eh Makhadi) is a village in Pishkuh-e Mugui Rural District, in the Central District of Fereydunshahr County, Isfahan Province, Iran. At the 2006 census, its population was 76, in 13 families.

References 

Populated places in Fereydunshahr County